David Gregory Miller (born 1957) is an American poet and academic. He has written four books of poetry. He is professor Emeritus of English at Millsaps College in Mississippi. Miller's poems have published in several literary magazines.

Biography

Miller was born in Kentucky. He has been a writing fellow at the Fine Arts Work Center in Provincetown, the Yaddo and MacDowell Colonies in the United States, and at the Camargo Foundation and the CAMAC Centre d’Art in France. Miller was named Mississippi Professor of the Year by the Carnegie Foundation for the Advancement of Teaching. Miller was the Janice C. Trimble Professor of English at Millsaps College in Jackson, Mississippi where he served as chair of the English Department and President of the Faculty Council. 

Miller received his Ph.D. in English from the University of California at Berkeley, his M.A. in English and Creative Writing from Stanford University and his B.A. in French Literature and Political Science from Vanderbilt University. Miller served as chair of the Sudanese Ministry Committee of the Episcopal Church, Diocese of Mississippi, where he edited and published, with the help of his students, a pamphlet of personal stories by Sudanese refugees entitled The Long Journey: Sudanese Refugees in Mississippi Tell Their Stories.

Works

Poetry
 Iron Wheel (1998) University of Chicago Press
 Rib Cage (2001) University of Chicago Press
 Mississippi Sudan (2006) by Mercy Seat Press
 Watch (October 2009) University of Chicago Press
 The Sea Sleeps: New and Selected Poems (June 2014) Paraclete Press
 George Herbert’s Latin Verse: Musae Responsoriae, Passio Discerpta, Lucus, and Alia Poemata (2017) Sacred Heart University Press
 Now and Then Here and Now: New and Selected Poems (2022) The Sheep Meadow Press

Literary criticism
 The Language of Love in the Poetry of George Herbert and Emily Dickinson (1992) doctoral dissertation at University of California, Berkeley
 Scribal and Print Publication: The Case of George Herbert's English Poems" (Fall 1999 / Spring 2000) George Herbert Journal, Volume 23, Numbers 1 & 2
 "Glorious, Afflicting, Beneficial": Triangular Romance and Dickinson's Rhetoric of Apocalypse (Fall 2002) The Emily Dickinson Journal, Volume 11, Number 2
 George Herbert's ‘Holy Patterns’: Reforming Individuals in Community (June 2007) Continuum Literary Studies
 Memory Work: Poetry, the Unconscious, and Justice: A Review of Peter Dale Scott’s “Poetry and Terror, Politics and Poetics in Coming to Jakarta” (August 16, 2021) Tikkun

Works on line
 "Glass House"
 "Home"
 "Pastoral"
 "Ruins"
 "Strasbourg"
 "Three Poems"
 Iron Wheel excerpts available on Google Book Search
 Rib Cage'' excerpts available on Google Book Search
 Greg Miller's website offers recordings of him reading a number of his poems out loud.

References

American male poets
1957 births
Living people
University of California, Berkeley alumni
Stanford University alumni
Vanderbilt University alumni